The Ford Simulator is a vehicle simulator developed for DOS by The SoftAd Group and Beck-Tech and published by Ford Motor Company in 1987. It was designed to promote the 1988 Ford line of automobiles.

Gameplay
The goal of the game was to give players an idea of how 16 cars would drive in the 1988 Ford lineup. It was created to mimic the physics of driving each car. The game features 4 different events in which you can drive cars. The events are Touring, Drag Strip, Slalom and Grand Prix. Touring allows you to simply drive and become familiar with the car. Drag Strip is the best time from 0 to 60 on a straight course. Slalom is a winding road formed with cones, with the risk of avoiding these cones one has to make there fastest time. And the Grand Prix is a 5-lap race around a track. Each event is intended to show how different parts of the car behave under certain conditions. At the end of each of the events were a Info center page covering the mechanics of the vehicles they offer. The Info center contained graphics depicting multiply Ford systems including Drive Systems, Aerodynamics, Fuel injection, Turbocharging, Steering, Braking, suspension and the Airbag system. It also came with a buyer's guide to building your dream car and calculating prices. The buyer's guide has four major categories being Model Specifications, Options, Sticker, and Buyer's plan. Model Specifications cover the selected models basic specs and major standard features. Options add option packages and individual options to customize the chosen model. Sticker allows you too print out a complete sticker with information on the chosen model. While the Buyer's plan use a financial spreadsheet to calculate the users cost and payments. The final feature of the game is the Ford Customer Response where a survey is asked for the user to do allowing you to print it out and mail it to the company.

References

1987 video games
Racing simulators
Racing video games
Ford video games
DOS games
DOS-only games
Ford Motor Company
Video games developed in the United States